E Re'ah Fahu is a 2016 Maldivian horror film directed by Ahmed Nimal. Produced by Hussain Rasheed under Fariva Films, the film stars Ali Seezan and Sujeetha Abdulla. The film also stars Nimal and Fathimath Muslima in supporting roles. The film was released on 4 February 2016.

Plot
Ikuleel (Ali Seezan) and his girlfriend Fathimath (Sujeetha Abdulla) engage in premarital sex in an abandoned house. Fathimath notices a change in Ikuleel's behavior when she meets him at different times of the day. He refuses to acknowledge any conversation they have in the midnight. Things get worse when Fathimath discovers that she is pregnant to the child of a spirit in disguise of Ikuleel.

Cast 
 Ali Seezan as Ikuleel
 Sujeetha Abdulla as Fathimath
 Ahmed Nimal as Razzaq
 Shafiu Mohamed as Ikuleel's friend
 Fathimath Muflihaa as Khadheeja; Fathimath's sister
 Abdul Rahman
 Aminath Abdul Rahman as Hawwa
 Ahmed Shifau
 Mohamed Waheed as Waheed; Khadheeja's ex-husband
 Hussain Ziyad
 Shiyad Ibrahim Rasheed
 Abdul Muhusin
 Adhham Mohamed

Soundtrack

Release and reception 
The film released on 4 February 2016, received negative response from critics and was declared a flop.

Accolades

References

2016 films
Maldivian horror films
Films directed by Ahmed Nimal